Jonathan Guus Ambrose Johnson (born 25 September 1976) has been the island governor of Saba since 2008.

Biography
Johnson was born on 25 September 1976 on Saba. He is the third and youngest child of Guy and Angela Johnson.

He studied in the United States, graduating from the University of Florida with a master's degree in education in 1999. Before becoming Island Governor, he taught at the Sacred Heart Elementary School for four years. In 2004, Johnson became the director of the Saba Comprehensive School and held that position until 2008.

Johnson has been married to Rosalyn Hassell since 2012, the couple have two children.

See also
Gerald Berkel, former island governor of Sint Eustatius (2010–2016)
Marnix van Rij, island governor of Sint Eustatius (2020– )
Edison Rijna, island governor of Bonaire
Sydney A. E. Sorton, former island governor of Saba (1989–1998 and 2006–2008)

References

1976 births
Living people
Lieutenant Governors of Saba
University of Florida alumni